Braem, Braemt, or Braems is a surname. Notable people with the surname include:

Joseph-Pierre Braemt (1796–1864), Belgian medalist 
Renaat Braem (1910–2001), Belgian architect
Guido Jozef Braem (born 1944), botanist
Harald Braem alias Wolfram vom Stein (born 1944), German writer
Urbain Braems (born 1933), retired Belgian football player and manager

See also

Bräm